Gurandukht, also Guarandukht (გუარანდუხტი), is a feminine given name in Georgia, ultimately derived from the Iranian Bahramdukht.  It was particularly popular among the medieval Georgian nobility. According to the Georgian Civil Registry, only 43 women in Georgia bore this name as of 2012.

Notable people
 Gurandukht, mother of Bagrat III of Georgia
 Gurandukht, daughter of George I of Georgia
 Gurandukht, wife of David IV of Georgia

References

Georgian feminine given names
Iranian feminine given names